1977 Japanese Super Cup was the inaugural Japanese Super Cup competition. The match was played at National Stadium in Tokyo on April 10, 1977. Furukawa Electric, who qualified as the 1976 Japan Soccer League champions, won the title against Yanmar Diesel. Yanmar qualified as 1976 Emperor's Cup runners-up, lost to Furukawa in the final.

Match details

References

Japanese Super Cup
1977 in Japanese football
JEF United Chiba matches
Cerezo Osaka matches